Three Men of the City is a 1974 Australian television series about a corporate battle.  It was followed in 1975 by the series The Company Men. In the sequel, Sir William's position as chairman was under siege.

References

External links
 Three Men of the City at AustLit
 

1970s Australian television miniseries
1974 Australian television series debuts
1974 Australian television series endings
1974 television films
1974 films